Swarm and Destroy is a documentary film chronicling the Moped Army and moped lifestyle.  The documentary was filmed at the Decepticon's 2003 Moped BBQ 6 event in Kalamazoo, Michigan.  The documentary is named after the motto of the Moped Army.

Synopsis
Swarm and Destroy opens with an interview of several moped riders at the Moped BBQ 6 rally, asking how they began riding.  These riders, from various branches of the Moped Army, describe their draw to the organization and the development of moped culture, recounting their favorite anecdotes of themselves and fellow moped riders.  The stories they tell are widely varied—from the gruesome account of a rider named Ree who was injured in a debilitating accident, to stories of vigilante justice, and many accounts of bizarre occurrences which happened while riding.

The documentary, from there, continues with an overview of the Moped BBQ event itself and the race at the BBQ, with footage shot around Kalamazoo at various race checkpoints.

The film ends with a recap of the event and interviews about growth of moped riding as a movement and the future of the Moped Army.

References

External links
Moped Army
Swarm and Destroy documentary available from 1977 Mopeds.
 for the East Lansing Film Festival.

Mopeds
American documentary films
2003 films
2000s English-language films
2000s American films